Rudaki District (Nohiyai Rudaki) is a district in Tajikistan, one of the Districts of Republican Subordination. It stretches south from Dushanbe, bordering on Shahrinav District, the city of Hisor, and Varzob District from the north and northwest, Tajikistan's Khatlon Region from the south and the east, and Uzbekistan from the west. Its administrative capital is Somoniyon, a southern suburb of Dushanbe, called Leninsky in the Soviet period. The population of the district is 518,200 (January 2020 estimate). 

A border guard training center is located here, used by the Tajik Border Troops. In October 2013, the Tajik Interior Ministry opened a new police station in the district.

Administrative divisions
They are as follows:

References

Districts of Tajikistan
Districts of Republican Subordination